Wallaconchis graniferus is a species of air-breathing sea slug, a shell-less marine pulmonate gastropod mollusk in the family Onchidiidae.

Distribution 
Wallaconchis graniferus is known from the Philippines and Indonesia.

References

External links
 Semper, C. (1870-1885). Reisen im Archipel der Philippinen, Theil 2. Wissenschaftliche Resultate. Band 3, Landmollusken. Wiesbaden: Kreidel.

Onchidiidae
Fauna of the Philippines
Fauna of Indonesia